NHK Cup
 NHK Cup (Go), Japanese professional Go tournament
 NHK Cup (shogi), Japanese professional shogi tournament
 NHK Mile Cup, Japanese horse race 
 NHK Trophy, figure skating competition
 Japanese Super Cup, football competition, formerly NHK Cup played in the 1967 season

Cup